The Battle of Vučji Do was a major battle of the Montenegrin-Ottoman War of 1876-78 that took place on 18 July 1876 in Vučji Do, Montenegro, fought between the combined forces of Montenegrin and Eastern Herzegovinian tribes (battalions) against the Ottoman Army under Grand Vizier Ahmed Muhtar Pasha. The Montenegrin-Herzegovinian forces heavily defeated the Ottomans, and managed to capture two of their commanders. In addition, they captured a large consignment of armament.

Background 
As the Uprising in Herzegovina continued, Germany, Russia and Austria-Hungary proposed a two-month truce at the meeting held in mid-May. At the same time negotiations between the Serbian and Montenegrin governments result to the two declaring war on the Ottoman Empire on 30 June 1876.

Battle 
The battle took place in Vučji Do, near Nikšić.

Selim Pasha was killed by Đoko Popović, from the Cuce tribe, while Osman Pasha was captured by Luka Dragišić, from the Piperi tribe.

Gallery

References

Sources
Gavro Vukotić, Rat 1876 Crne Gore sa Turskom, Cetinje 1929. (COBISS.SR-ID:30379271)
Lj. Poleksić, Boj na Vučjem Dolu 28. jula 1876, Ratnik, X/1940
Dimitrije Trifunović, Vučji Do, Military encyclopaedia (second edition), том X, p. 626, Vojnoizdavački zavod Belgrade, Belgrade 1975
Мilutin Miljušković Velike crnogorske bitke: Vučji do i Fundina, Podgorica 1997.  (COBISS.SR-ID:121793031)

Principality of Montenegro
Vucji Do
Vucji Do
Conflicts in 1876
1876 in the Ottoman Empire
1876 in Europe
Ottoman period in the history of Montenegro
Montenegrin–Ottoman War (1876–1878)